This is a list of mayors of Lausanne, Switzerland. The mayor of Lausanne (syndic de Lausanne) presides the municipal council (municipalité), the city's executive.

References
Archives de la Ville de Lausanne – Liste chronologique des syndics de Lausanne dès 1803 on Lausanne.ch

Lausanne
Lists of mayors (complete 1900-2013)